Dichrostachys is an Old World genus of flowering plants in the family Fabaceae. Their Acacia-like leaves are bi-pinnately compound. Unlike Acacia their thorns are hardened branchlets rather than modified stipules. They are native from Africa to Australasia, but a centre of diversity is present in Madagascar.

Their name is derived from the Greek words dis (two), chroos (colour) and stachys (grain ear or spike), which in combination suggests their bi-colored inflorescences.

Species
It contains the following species:
 Dichrostachys akataensis Villiers
 Dichrostachys arborescens (Benth.) Villiers
 Dichrostachys bernieriana Baill.
 Dichrostachys cinerea (L.) Wight & Arn.
 Dichrostachys dehiscens Balf. f.
 Dichrostachys dumetaria Villiers
 Dichrostachys kirkii Benth.
 Dichrostachys paucifoliolata (Scott-Elliot) Drake
 Dichrostachys pervilleanus (Baill.) Drake
 Dichrostachys richardiana Baill.
 Dichrostachys santapaui Sebast. & Ramam.
 Dichrostachys scottiana (Drake) Villiers
 Dichrostachys spicata (F.Muell.) Domin
 Dichrostachys tenuifolia Benth.
 Dichrostachys unijuga Baker
 Dichrostachys venosa Villiers

References

Legume WEB

 
Fabaceae genera
Taxonomy articles created by Polbot